James Oswald is a Scottish writer and farmer who has written the Inspector McLean and (as J. D. Oswald) The Ballad of Sir Benfro series of books.

He initially self-published his books but is now published by Penguin. Since 2018 he has been published by Wildfire, an imprint of Headline, where he has continued the Inspector McLean series and introduced a new series character Constance Fairchild.

His brother is the playwright Peter Oswald. His maternal grandfather was Patrick McLaughlin (churchman).

Early life
Oswald was born a son of farmer and stockbroker Peter David Hamilton Oswald and Juliet (née McLaughlin). His uncle was Sir Julian Oswald, First Sea Lord from 1989 to 1993. The Oswalds were landed gentry, of Cavens, Dumfries, and Auchincruive (now named "Oswald Hall"), South Ayrshire, Scotland, descending from merchant George Oswald, Rector of the University of Glasgow from 1797 to 1799,

Inspector McLean series
Inspector Anthony McLean is a detective in the Lothian and Borders Police force, stationed in Edinburgh.

Constance Fairchild series

The Ballad of Sir Benfro series

His farm
He runs a livestock farm in North East Fife, where he raises Highland cattle.

References

External links

Year of birth missing (living people)
Living people
Scottish writers